Anti-Japanese sentiment in China is an issue with modern roots (post-1868). Modern anti-Japanese sentiment in China is often rooted in nationalist or historical conflict, for example the atrocities and war crimes committed by the Japanese in the Second Sino-Japanese War and Japan's history textbook controversies.

Bitterness in China persists over the Second Sino-Japanese War and Japan's post-war actions. This sentiment may also be at least to some extent influenced by issues related to Chinese people in Japan.

According to a 2017 BBC World Service Poll, mainland Chinese people hold the largest anti-Japanese sentiment in the world, with 75% of Chinese people viewing Japan's influence negatively, and 22% expressing a positive view. Anti-Japanese sentiment in China was at its highest in 2014 since the poll was first conducted in 2006 and was up 16 percent over the previous year. However, anti-Japanese sentiment significantly decreased by 2018; a poll done in 2018 by Genron NPO showed that 42.2% of Chinese people looked positively to Japan, up from 31.5% in 2017.

Earlier history
Throughout Chinese history, except for the Wokou raids (Japanese pirates) during the late Ming dynasty and the Japanese invasions of Korea which Ming China intervened on the side of Korea, there had been little serious conflicts between China and Japan.

However, due to the Meiji Restoration, Japan became a modern power and attempted to expand their empire in Asia, including China. In the late Qing dynasty, Japan seized concessions in parts of the Chinese mainland and annexed Taiwan and Penghu from China, as well as removing the vassal states of Ryukyu Kingdom and Korea from China’s sphere of influence and later annexing them. Dissatisfaction with the settlement and the Twenty-One Demands by the Imperial Japanese government led to a severe boycott of Japanese products in China in 1915.

The Tungans (Chinese Muslims, Hui people) had anti-Japanese sentiment.

Effects of Interwar period wars and World War II
After the Mukden Incident in 1931, which was used as pretext for the Japanese invasion of Manchuria, Manchuria came under Japanese control. A puppet state named Manchukuo was set up with the deposed emperor Puyi as the head of state. In 1937, the Marco Polo Bridge Incident that happened in Peking (Beijing) became the pretext to the start of the Second Sino-Japanese War. Most reasons for anti-Japanese sentiment in China can be directly traced to the Second Sino-Japanese War, which was also the first theatre of World War II. As a consequence of the war, China suffered 7 million to 16 million civilian deaths and 3 million military casualties. In addition, the war caused an estimated US$383.3 billion in damage and created 95 million refugees. Many major cities including Nanjing, Shanghai, and Beijing were occupied in 1937 by the Japanese. Notable incidents included the Nanking Massacre. In Manchuria, Unit 731, a medical unit of the Japanese army, researched biological warfare using Chinese civilians as test subjects, who were referred to as human 'logs' in the medical journals. Women from many Asian countries, including China and Korea, were made to serve as prostitutes in military brothels (and were often referred to as "comfort women") under Japanese occupation.

Postwar issues
There is deep resentment over the veneration of Japanese war veterans in the Yasukuni Shrine, where a number of war criminals are enshrined, treated as kami or important spirits, and the fact that the shrine openly states that the purpose of Japanese military involvement in Asia was to bring prosperity and liberation to Asians. This is further exacerbated by attempts to whitewash Japan's role in the war in certain school history textbooks, such as by softening some statements and removing others. That some popular media such as comics, books, movies, or documentaries depicting Japanese wartime involvement in atrocities are withdrawn due to nationalist or popular sentiment further contributes to this image. As examples, critics point to the withdrawal of Iris Chang's The Rape of Nanking from planned publication and the censorship of scenes of the Nanking Massacre from the Japanese theatrical release of The Last Emperor.

China refused war reparations from Japan in the 1972 Joint Communiqué. Japan gave official development assistance (ODA), amounting to 3 trillion yen (US$30 billion). According to estimates, Japan accounts for more than 60 percent of China's ODA received. About 25 percent of the funding for all of China's infrastructure projects between 1994 and 1998 — including roads, railways, telecom systems and harbours — came from Japan.

Japanese aid to China was rarely formally publicized to the Chinese people by the Chinese government, until Japan announced that aid was to be phased out. It was finally publicly acknowledged by Chinese premier Wen Jiabao during his April 2007 trip to Japan.

There is a perception among some Chinese that the United States, Japan, and Taiwan are attempting to contain China. Japan's more recent debate to revise Article 9, the "No War" clause, is viewed with suspicion of possible re-militarization. Anti-Japanese sentiment in China is also highlighted by the branding of several prominent Taiwanese politicians (especially those who advocate for Taiwanese independence) as "Japanese running dogs" and hanjian (traitors) by the state-run media.

Contemporary issues

Issues from the Second World War continue to generate ill-feeling in China. One issue is Japanese disposal of chemical weapons left in China by Japanese troops at the end of the war. The Chemical Weapons Convention (CWC), which came into effect in April 1997, and the Memorandum on the Destruction of Japanese Discarded Chemical Weapons in China, signed on 30 July 1999, required Japan to dispose of an estimated 700,000 abandoned chemical weapons (Japanese estimate). Japan was unable to complete the work on time and requested a five-year extension.

Chinese plaintiffs suing the Japanese government over accidents caused by the unearthing of poison gas have had difficulty gaining satisfaction from Japanese courts. Forty-three people who were injured in a 2003 accident and five relatives of one who died have been unsuccessful in their claim for 1.43 billion yen (US$11.8 million; €9.1 million), as well as for medical costs and loss of income due to health problems. Such issues continue to cause ill-will.

On March 13, 2007, the Tokyo High Court upheld a lower court ruling and rejected compensation claims from four Chinese people who were injured and one whose relative died from being exposed to chemical weapons abandoned by Imperial Japan in China at the end of the war. Presiding Judge Hiromitsu Okita said the Japanese government was not liable for death or injury from the weapons, saying it could not have conducted a proper search for weapons in another country. The plaintiffs had sought a combined 80 million yen from the Japanese government. The court said the state was not obligated to conduct a search or to pay damages "because it cannot be said that the defendants could have prevented the outcome" of the death and injuries in the case, according to Japan Times. There were at least 700,000 pieces of chemical weapons Japan buried in China with site information destroyed by Japanese military according to the Japanese Ministry of Foreign Affairs. Such lawsuits have been filed before, but Japanese courts have rejected most claims filed by individual WWII war crime victims.

In March 2007, Japanese Prime Minister Shinzo Abe sparked a row over "comfort women." A group of about 120 lawmakers from Abe's governing party wanted the prime minister to revise the official apology. The lawmakers claimed there was no evidence to suggest the Japanese military was directly involved in coercing the women. They said they would present the government with a petition next week demanding a rewrite of the apology, which they considered a stain on Japan's national honor. Abe told reporters in his Tokyo office that he shared the belief that there was no direct proof of the military's involvement, stating: "The fact is, there is no evidence to prove there was coercion," he said according to LA Times. Abe said the government would cooperate with a study to be conducted by a group of Liberal Democratic party MPs who are sceptical of claims that thousands of Asian women were forced to work in Japanese military brothels before and during the Second World War according to Guardian. After the condemnation around the world, Abe made a qualified apology, saying "I express my sympathy for the hardships they suffered and offer my apology for the situation they found themselves in." Abe told the legislature when pressed on what he would say to the aging survivors of the "comfort women" system: "As the prime minister, I am apologizing here" according to LA Times.

Continued visits by Japanese politicians to the Yasukuni Shrine, and the recent approval of a textbook that downplays the Nanking Massacre and the role of sex slaves in the Imperial Japanese Army have further aroused Chinese sentiment. Japan's campaign to become a permanent member of the UN Security Council has met with stiff opposition among Chinese people. The Diaoyu Islands / Senkaku Islands, currently controlled and claimed by Japan, but claimed by both PRC and ROC, continue to be a sticking point and a symbolic focus of anti-Japanese sentiment in China.

The buildup of anti-Japanese sentiment, aided by websites, had been noted by Western media in early 2005. In spring 2005, anti-Japanese demonstrations were organized by anti-Japanese elements in several cities across China. The Internet, including instant messaging services, was used in organizing groups of demonstrators to take part in protests. Many were calling for a boycott of Japanese products. The result was an apology by the Japanese PM. Concern at anti-Japanese sentiment is believed to be behind the decision of Chinese censors to ban the film Memoirs of a Geisha on February 1, 2006. The fact that Chinese actresses played Japanese geisha, often wrongly perceived as prostitutes in China, had caused considerable controversy among some elements of the Chinese population.

There have been several reports that stores, restaurants, public institutions and hospitals in China refuse to serve Japanese customers because Japan has not apologized for the invasion of China.

Anti-Japanese sentiment at sporting events

2004 AFC Asian Cup
During the 2004 Asian Cup held in China, Chinese fans booed the Japanese team during the playing of the Japanese national anthem at matches against several countries, including China. Except for the match against Bahrain, Japanese supporters were instructed by the local police not to use "banners, flags, musical instruments or wear team uniforms" and were asked to refrain from cheering. The flight to Beijing, the venue of the final match against China, was delayed for two hours due to Chinese protesters at Beijing International Airport. After Japan defeated China 3-1 in the final, Chinese fans were enraged and the Japanese ambassador's car was severely damaged.

2007 FIFA Women's World Cup
At the last game of Group A of 2007 FIFA Women's World Cup held in Hangzhou, tens of thousands of Chinese spectators in attendance cheered for the German team and booed the Japanese team vehemently. Japan was defeated by Germany and knocked out of the tournament prematurely. The Japanese players later held up a banner to thank China ("Arigato 謝謝 (Xie Xie) China") at the end of the game while the audience applauded in response. The incident caused minor controversy in China over the Chinese nationalism and anti-Japanese sentiment displayed at the game.

The game was originally planned to be held on September 18, the anniversary of the Mukden Incident. Because of the sensitive nature of the date in China, it was held one day earlier.

2008 EAFF Cup
During the 2008 WAFF Cup, Chinese fans booed the Japanese anthem again in Japan's first match against North Korea in Chongqing on February 17. The attitude of Chinese fans had not improved despite police warnings before the game. After the match between the Japanese team and the Chinese national team on February 20, a small group of Chinese fans burnt the Japanese national flag and booed the Japanese team with the derogatory term, xiǎo Rìběn (小日本, "puny Japanese").

Diaoyu/Senkaku Islands dispute

In 2012, the Japanese government decided to purchase the Diaoyu/Senkaku Islands from a Japanese family. Riots broke out in most Chinese major cities, and Japanese-owned business were smashed. In Shenzhen, the rioting crowd tried to take over a government building, demanding the Chinese government to declare war with Japan. There were multiple reports where people who were using Japanese products were attacked in the public. There was a report that a man in Hainan Province was stabbed to death for saying that Japan may win if a war between China and Japan broke out.

Anti-Japanese film industry
Anti-Japanese sentiment can be seen in anti-Japanese war films produced and displayed in mainland China. More than 200 anti-Japanese films are made in China each year. In one situation involving a more moderate anti-Japanese war film, the government of China temporarily banned 2000's Devils on the Doorstep, partly because it depicted a Japanese soldier being friendly with Chinese villagers.

Anti-Natsumatsuri
Natsumatsuri (夏祭り, lit. Summer Festival) events in mainland China were cancelled after protests broke out since 16 July 2022. Some people, reasoning that because natsumatsuri originates in Japan, claim that it should not be a festival celebrated in China. A scandal in the Xuanzang Temple in which some Imperial Japanese Army generals who were convicted war criminals were memorialised contributed to anti-Japanese sentiment.

See also
 China–Japan relations
 History of China–Japan relations
 2012 China anti-Japanese demonstrations
 Anti-Chinese sentiment in Japan
 Anti-Japaneseism
 Anti-Japanese sentiment in Korea
 Anti-Japanese sentiment in the United States
 Anti-Japan War Online
 Anti-Western sentiment in China
 Chinese nationalism
 Ethnic issues in China
 Hanjian
 Jingri
 Nanjing Massacre

References

Sources
 

 
China–Japan relations
Japanese war crimes